Boumedienne Allam (born Avignon, 19 November 1979) is a French-born Algerian rugby union player. He plays as a number eight.

After his young years at Apt (1994–1996) and Cavaillon (1996–1997), he became a famous figure as a RC Toulon player (1997–2000), where he won the Cup of France Frantz Reichel, in 1998. He moved to RC Narbonne (2000–2003), and latter to Tarbes Pyrénées Rugby (2003–2004) and to FC Auch (2004–2005). After a season at FC Barcelona, in Spain (2005–2006), he moved back to France, where he played for Blagnac SCR. He played for the Doncaster Knights, in England, in 2008/09. He returned to France, playing for Le Bugue AC, in 2009/10. He played for AS Mâcon, from 2010/11 to 2011/12, and currently plays for AGDE, since the 2012/13 season.

International career 
Allam was capped for the France U-21 squad, winning the Six Nations Tournament of that category with them in 2000. A few years later, Allam switched alliance and chose the country of his grandparents to represent in senior fixtures. He was a member of the historical unofficial first game of Algeria, on 24 February 2007, as well as the official first match for Algeria on 18 December since creating the Algerian rugby federation a month earlier. This significant match was also the first rugby international played on Algerian soil which was televised.

References

1979 births
Sportspeople from Avignon
French rugby union players
Algerian rugby union players
Doncaster R.F.C. players
Living people
Rugby union number eights
Algerian expatriate rugby union players
Expatriate rugby union players in France
Expatriate rugby union players in Spain
French sportspeople of Algerian descent
Algerian expatriate sportspeople in Spain
French expatriate sportspeople in Spain
Algerian expatriate sportspeople in England
French expatriate sportspeople in England